Agata Wybieralska (born 6 June 1978) is a Polish-Italian field hockey player for the Italian national team.

She participated at the 2018 Women's Hockey World Cup.

References

1978 births
Living people
Italian female field hockey players
Female field hockey defenders
Expatriate field hockey players
Italian expatriate sportspeople in Argentina
Polish female field hockey players